A Album is the debut album of the Japanese group KinKi Kids. It was released on July 21, 1997, on the same day as their debut single "Garasu no Shōnen". The album debuted at the top of the Oricon charts, selling 315,330 copies in its first week. It was certified Million by RIAJ and is currently the duo's second best-selling album.

Track listing

References

 A Album. Johnny's net. Retrieved October 31, 2009.

External links
 Official KinKi Kids website

1997 debut albums
KinKi Kids albums